Robert Marlowe Amparan is an American criminal defense attorney currently based in San Francisco, California.  He became notable for successfully defending former JonBenét Ramsey murder suspect John Mark Karr, along with attorneys Gayle Gutekunst and Ben Prince, in his legal battle with the state of California on child pornography charges.  After a series of defense motions, the case was eventually dismissed.

Experience
He is a  former member of the San Francisco Public Defender's Office and focuses mainly on criminal defense.  He has practiced law in both California State and Federal Courts. Mr. Amparán has garnered local attention in San Francisco for his aggressive defense style.

Ed Rosenthal

Amparan represented Ed Rosenthal in his retrial in Federal Court for allegedly distributing marijuana despite the fact that Rosenthal was deputized by the City of Oakland to help administer medical marijuana under California's medical marijuana law.

John Mark Karr

In August 2006, an American teacher living abroad named John Mark Karr falsely confessed to the unsolved murder of JonBenét Ramsey, creating a media frenzy. Ramsey was found beaten and strangled in the basement of her family's home in Boulder, Colorado, in 1996. Karr said he was present when Ramsey died and called her death an "accident". Karr was arrested in Bangkok, Thailand, on August 16, 2006, by Thai authorities, then released to U.S. agents and flown first to Los Angeles, California, then to Boulder for further investigation. On August 28, prosecutors announced they had decided not to pursue charges in connection with the murder after DNA tests failed to place Karr at the scene. Karr was held in Boulder until September 12, 2006, when he was transported to Sonoma County, California to face unrelated misdemeanor child pornography charges.  Mr. Amparán agreed to represent him.  On September 20, 2006, Amparan was quoted as saying of Karr that he was a "Southern gentleman with a sense of humor."  The case was dismissed on October 5, 2006.

Notes

External links 
 official website 

Year of birth missing (living people)
Living people
California lawyers
Criminal defense lawyers
American people of Basque descent